Ubungo II Thermal Power Station was an extension to the Ubungo I Power Station and began commercial operations in 2012.

History
Symbion Power already had extensive electrification contracts within Tanzania. Symbion helped build a power plant in May 2011 and was operational in under one month. The introduction of the Symbion Power Plant to the Tanzanian electricity helped alleviate the problems experienced in the country caused by severe power shedding. Symbion's projects were funded by the Government of the United States through the Millennium Challenge Corporation.

The Power plant was handed over to the Tanzania Electric Supply Company in June 2011 and TANESCO planned to convert the current power plant to a permanent facility. TANESCO awarded Jacobsen Elektro AS from Norway to construct the Ubungo II Gas Based Power Plant.

The Ubungo II Gas Based Power Plant was constructed in 14 months and began operations on 1 July 2012. Unlike the Ubungo I plant, this plant is owned and operated entirely by TANESCO. However the gas for this plant is still obtained by Songas.

See also
Ubungo I Thermal Power Station
Tanzania Electric Supply Company Limited (TANESCO)
List of power stations in Tanzania
Economy of Tanzania

References

Power stations in Tanzania